Hamish Wilson (13 December 1942 – 26 March 2020) was a Scottish actor from Glasgow who was best known for briefly taking over the role of Jamie McCrimmon for part of two episodes in the 1968 Doctor Who serial The Mind Robber when series regular Frazer Hines was ill with chickenpox and unable to attend the recording. The change of actor was written in as part of the story when Jamie is turned into a cardboard cut-out and has his face removed by the Master of the Land of Fiction. The Second Doctor's first attempt to reconstruct his face is unsuccessful. Eventually, Jamie's real face is restored when Hines recovered.

Wilson trained as an actor at the Royal Scottish Academy of Music and Drama and his early work includes an appearance on the first series of The Vital Spark (in the only surviving episode of that series, 1966's "A Drop O' The Real Stuff"). At the time of his Doctor Who appearance, he was working in London for a furniture removal firm. His other work includes numerous TV guest appearances in programmes such as Softly, Softly and Monarch of the Glen, and involvement in the documentary and the audio commentary on the 2005 DVD release of "The Mind Robber". Wilson also acted in Greyfriars Bobby (1961) and TimeLock (2013). Starting in the 1970s, Wilson became a continuity announcer with STV in Glasgow, he then became a radio producer, working with Radio Forth and Radio Clyde before moving to the BBC's Scottish radio drama unit in Edinburgh in 1989, where he made programmes for BBC Radio Scotland as well as BBC Radio 3 and BBC Radio 4. He received a fellowship from the Royal Scottish Academy of Music and Drama in 1996. He was also a staff member at the Guildhall School of Music and Drama.

Death
Wilson died from COVID-19 in hospital near his home in Bladnoch, near Wigtown, Dumfriesshire on 26 March 2020, at age 77, during the COVID-19 pandemic in Scotland. He is survived by his wife Diana and daughters Emma, Abigail and Alice.

References

External links

1942 births
2020 deaths
Academics of the Guildhall School of Music and Drama
Alumni of the Royal Conservatoire of Scotland
Deaths from the COVID-19 pandemic in Scotland
Male actors from Glasgow
Scottish male television actors
Scottish radio producers
20th-century Scottish male actors
21st-century Scottish male actors